Lạc Long Quân (Chữ Hán:貉龍君; "Dragon King of Lạc"; also called Sùng Lãm 崇纜) is a semi-mythical king of the Hồng Bàng dynasty of ancient Vietnam. Quân was the son of Kinh Dương Vương, the king of Xích Quỷ.

According to the myth, Lạc Long Quân married Âu Cơ, a mountain fairy. She gives birth to a sac containing 100 eggs from which 100 children were born; this is the origin of the Vietnamese peoples. One day Lạc Long Quân told Âu Cơ: "I am descended from dragons, you from fairies. We are as incompatible as water is with fire. So we cannot continue in harmony." This said, the husband and wife parted. The man went to the seawards with 50 of their children, while his wife went to the mountainous region with the other half of the clan. The eldest son, who followed his mother, later installed himself as Quân's successor.

Genealogy

Lạc Long Quân's father was Kinh Dương Vương and Lạc Long Quân's mother is Thần Long.

In Vietnamese literature
Ngô Sĩ Liên commented on the somewhat primitive nature of the relationship between the two progenitors, given that Lạc's father Kinh Dương Vương and Âu's grandfather Đế Nghi were brothers.

Mythology

Slaying of the Ngư tinh

During Lạc Long Quân's time, the people of Van Lang was still undeveloped and isolated. In the Eastern sea, there appears a giant Fish called Ngư Tinh  (Vietnamese for "fish monster" or "fish spirit"). This fish has lived for many centuries and had a mouth so big it could swallow an entire ship containing 10 fisherman in a single gulp. Whenever the fish swim, waves would reach for the sky, drowning many ships unfortunate enough to be caught in its path, and all the people passing through the area would become the fish's next meal. Ngư Tinh lives in a big cave under the sea, above the cave is a huge mountain which divides the sea into two areas.

Lạc Long Quân decided to offer his help to the people by slaying the fish. He built a huge ship, made a burning human-shaped piece of metal, then sailed straight towards Ngư Tinh's nest. There he held the human-shaped piece of metal up to trick Ngư Tinh. Ngư Tinh thought it was a human, so it opened its mouth and tried to swallow to burning metal. Quân then threw the burning metal into Ngư Tinh's mouth. Ngư Tinh 's throat was burning, it struggled and tried to sink Quân's ship. Quân then took his sword out and slew the beast, slicing it into three pieces.

Slaying of the Hồ tinh

After slaying Ngư Tinh, Quân went down to Long Biên. There lived a one thousand-year old nine-tailed fox called Hồ Tinh (Vietnamese for "fox monster" or "fox spirit"). The fox lived in a deep cave, beneath Rock Mountain in the west of Long Biên. This fox often disguised itself as a human in order to lure the village men and women, then bring them to the cave and devour them. This fox has been harassing people from Long Biên to Tản Viên mountain for centuries and the villagers were so afraid of the fox that they have to leave their homes and farms to other places in order to live peacefully. Quân brought his sword to the beast's nest and set out to slay the beast, just as he had with Ngư Tinh before. When Quân reached the cave, the fox smelt the scent of human flesh and emerged her lair to confront whoever it was who dared trespass into her domain.  Upon seeing the beast, Quân then used magic to call the elements of wind and thunder to trap Hồ Tinh and after 3 days, the beast was weakened and attempted to flee from her attacker, but Quân caught the demon fox and decapitated her. Quân descended into the cave and rescued everybody that was still alive and returned them back to Long Biên.

Vietnamese creation myth 
Descendant of Dragon and Fairy

Based on the 16th century mythical genealogy , Lạc Long Quân is the son of Kinh Dương Vương and Long Mẫu Thần Long, the dragon goddess that rules the sky and the ocean. He was married to Âu Cơ, the daughter of the sixth Flame Emperor Đế Lai. Âu Cơ gave birth to a sac of a hundred eggs, which were hatched into a hundred boys. One day, Quân confessed to her: "I am a descendant of the Dragon, you are descendant of the Fairy, fire and water cannot live together in harmony." The two of them then divided their children. Fifty sons followed their mother to the mountainous north, the other fifty followed their father to live in the south; these children are ancestor of Vietnamese. The oldest brother followed Âu Cơ to Phong Châu (Phú Thọ), became Quân's successor and ruled as Hung King. It's the story of the earliest divorce in Vietnamese history.

Legacy
Most cities in Vietnam have named major streets after him. He features both in primary education and in some forms of popular religious belief as a god.

Nội Bình Đà Temple 

After the Đức Quốc Ancestor ascended to heaven, the mandarins and people built a year-round temple to worship the National Ancestor, now a national monument Noi Temple belongs to Binh Da, Binh Minh, Thanh Oai, Hanoi. At present, the temple still preserves many precious antiques, including the statue of the National Ancestor Lac Long Quan and the martial arts officials attending the boat racing festival, and the four-word big letter "VÌ BÁCH VIỆT TỔ" (meaning the ancestor of Baiyue "Bách Việt").

In the past, under feudal dynasties, Bình Đà villagers held festivals, kings sent mandarins from the court and many generals and communes in the region to organize festivals and offer incense to commemorate the National Ancestor. In 1032, King Lý Thái Tông offered a decree to honor Lạc Long Quân:

 "Lý triều hiến sắc
 Thánh tổ tiên vương
 Nhất bào bách noãn
 Sinh hạ bách thần
 Khai quốc an dân
 Vạn xuân an lạc"

 "Ly dynasty gives color
 Holy Ancestor King
 One-celled oocyte
 Birth of a Hundred Gods
 Opening the nation and the people
 Peaceful Spring"

 During six centuries, the 16 kings of the dynasties personally went to Bình Đà to celebrate the National Ancestor's ceremony. There have been 16 decrees honoring Lạc Long Quân as "Khai Quốc Thần" (these offerings are kept at Nội Bình Đà Temple and the National Museum of History).

From the past until now, on the occasion of the festival, there have been a group of hands from of Hùng Temple - Phú Thọ to offer incense to the Holy Ancestor and ask for a procession of incense at the first incense altar of the temple. Grandmother returned to worship, with the meaning of respectfully welcoming the Holy Ancestor to attend the festival Hùng Temple on the tenth day of the third lunar month.

National relic Nội Temple and National Ancestral Tomb located on sacred land Bình Đà will forever be the place for Lạc Hồng descendants to worship the National Ancestor.

Religion 

'''Đạo Mo''' is an ancient Vietnamese belief that mentions a similar story.

The Earth God and the Forest God gave birth to a daughter named Shennong. Shennong grew up to marry the son of the Water God and the Storm God name the Dragon God. Because both families hate each other, they try their best to prevent this marriage. The Forest God sent some tree ghosts to harass them, but every tree that came, was cut down by Shennong. The Dragon God used that pile of wood to build a big house for the couple. The Storm God was very angry, so he blew up his son's house. Even so, the Dragon God did not give up, no matter how many times the Storm God blew the house away, the next day the Dragon God continued to build a new house even bigger than before. After an incalculable amount of time, finally built a house that the Storm God could not blow it away, knowing that he could not change his child's mind, so the Storm God returned away. The Dragon God named this house is the wind, implying that the storm is just a small wind that can never shake this house.

Not long after, Shen Nong became pregnant and gave birth to a bag of hundreds of eggs, which gave birth to a hundred children. The Dragon God took care of his wife and children for a while, then he felt homesick and returned to the sea. After that, the Dragon God never came back, and Shennong sadding went to the mountain to look at the sea and wait for her husband forever. As for their children, they split up and live everywhere, they call the place where they live is country to remind them of their roots and keep in touch with each other in the hope that one day their father will return.

Evaluate 
The views of Khâm định Việt sử Thông giám cương mục about Lạc Long Quân is:

Rehearsing the words of the historical mandarins, King Tự Đức considered these to be "stories referring to buffalo ghosts, snake gods, and myths without standards" and resolutely removed Kinh Dương and Lạc Long from the official history.

Author Liam Christopher Kelley commented:''Over the centuries, the traditions they [historians] created have become second nature. In fact, in the past half century, under the influence of nationalism, those invented traditions have become and are becoming unchangeable facts.''

Notes

References

External links
Google Books search
 Google Books search
Google Books search

See also

List of monarchs of Vietnam
Hồng Bàng dynasty
Yue (state)
Goujian

Ancient Vietnam
Hồng Bàng dynasty
Vietnamese culture
Vietnamese deities
Vietnamese gods
Legendary monarchs
Legendary Vietnamese people